Cita en la frontera is a 1940 Argentine film directed by Mario Soffici and starring Libertad Lamarque.

Cast
Orestes Caviglia
Floren Delbene
Maria Esther Duckse
Elisa Galvé
Eliseo Herrero
Libertad Lamarque
Claudio Martino
José Otal
Oscar Valicelli

External links
 

1940 films
1940s Spanish-language films
Argentine black-and-white films
Films directed by Mario Soffici
1940s Argentine films